Jean-Claude Boulard (28 March 1943 – 1 June 2018) was a French politician. He was mayor of Le Mans from 2001 until his death, senator from 2014 to 2017, and deputy of National Assembly from 1988 to 1993 and again from 1997 to 2002.

Early life
Born in Nantes on 28 March 1943, to artist Jean Boulard and his wife Marthe Savoyant-Boulard. His family moved to Saint-Marceau, Sarthe, and later Paris. Boulard graduated from Lycée Henri-IV and attended Sciences Po, where he studied sociology and ethnology.

Political career
Boulard was first appointed to the Council of State in 1968. Boulard worked for the French Merchant Navy, then returned to the Council of State. His first political office was deputy mayor of Saint-Marceau. He was elected to the Sarthe departmental council in 1976, and became president of Le Mans Métropole in 1983, representing the Socialist Party–Radical Party of the Left coalition. Boulard won a seat on the National Assembly in 1988, but failed to win reelection in 1993. He returned to the Assembly in 1997, and served until 2002. Boulard supported minimum integration income during his first term, and was a proponent of universal health coverage in his second term. Boulard was first elected mayor of Le Mans in 2001. From 2014 to 2017, he sat on the Senate, representing Sarthe. 

Boulard's wife Dominique served as mayor of Saint-Marceau.

Death
Boulard fell ill in early 2018, remaining mayor of Le Mans until his death in the city on 1 June 2018, aged 75.

References

1943 births
2018 deaths
Politicians from Nantes
Socialist Party (France) politicians
Deputies of the 9th National Assembly of the French Fifth Republic
Deputies of the 11th National Assembly of the French Fifth Republic
French Senators of the Fifth Republic
Senators of Sarthe
Mayors of places in Pays de la Loire
People from Le Mans
Sciences Po alumni